Fabio Grosso  (born 28 November 1977) is an Italian former professional footballer and current manager of Frosinone Calcio.

After playing for several smaller Italian clubs, such as Renato Curi, Chieti and Perugia, he made his breakthrough during his two seasons with Palermo, which earned him a move to defending Serie A champions Inter Milan in 2006. During his only season with Inter, he helped the club defend the Serie A title and win the Supercoppa Italiana. He later also won titles with Lyon in France and with Juventus. Grosso retired in 2012 after winning the Scudetto with Juventus.

At international level, Grosso made 48 appearances for Italy and scored the decisive late first goal against Germany in the 2006 World Cup semi-final. He also scored the winning penalty in the penalty shootout against France in the final of the tournament which enabled the Azzurri to win the trophy for the fourth time in their history. He also represented Italy at UEFA Euro 2008 and at the 2009 FIFA Confederations Cup.

Club career

Renato Curi
Grosso was born in Rome but hails from Chieti, Abruzzo, where his family soon returned to. Grosso joined Renato Curi Angolana in 1994 and played in the club's youth system until 1995. He was promoted to the senior squad for the 1995–96 season and soon became a key part of the first team. Following the 1997–98 season, he left the Eccellenza club to join Chieti for an undisclosed transfer fee. Grosso made 108 official appearances for Renato Curi, scoring a very impressive 47 goals as an attacking midfielder and left winger.

Chieti
In summer 1998, Grosso transferred to Chieti of Serie C2. An attacking midfielder at the time, he again impressed in his three-season spell with Chieti. He scored 17 goals in 68 league appearances. Following several impressive performances, he was scouted by Serie A club Perugia in 2001, and in mid-summer, Grosso officially transferred to the club.

Perugia
In July 2001, Grosso officially joined Perugia. In his debut Serie A season, he made 24 appearances and scored one goal. By now, he had been converted into a left wing-back by head coach Serse Cosmi and in his second season in Perugia, he maintained a starting position and made 30 league appearances, scoring four goals. In his third season with Perugia, Grosso made just 12 appearances in the first six months of the 2003–04 season. To some surprise, Grosso transferred from Perugia in January 2004 to Palermo, which at the time played in Serie B. In 2003, during his time with Perugia, Grosso earned his first Italy cap.

Palermo
During the winter transfer window in January 2004, Grosso transferred to the Sicilian side and they earned promotion at the conclusion to the season. Grosso made 21 appearances for his new club in the latter portion of the 2003–04 season, scoring one goal, as the club won the Serie B title.

Palermo's first season in Serie A was very successful as the club managed a very impressive sixth-place finish, losing just nine matches and also qualifying for the UEFA Cup. Grosso contributed as a regular starter, making 36 league appearances, also scoring a single goal. During the 2005–06 Serie A season, Grosso made 33 appearances for his club as Palermo impressed, finishing eighth in Serie A. He was one of four Palermo players who made Marcello Lippi's 2006 FIFA World Cup-winning squad, but at the conclusion of the tournament, Grosso was sold to Inter Milan.

Inter Milan
In July 2006, Grosso joined Inter for a reported €5 million transfer fee (plus Paolo Dellafiore). However, Grosso was in-and-out of the club's starting line-up and was mostly used as a substitute. He made just 23 appearances for Inter in the league, and scored two goals, as the team captured the 2006 Supercoppa Italiana and the Serie A title. Following the disappointing season with Inter, Grosso opted to move abroad and was sold to Olympique Lyonnais in the summer of 2007, just one year after his move to Inter.

Lyon
In July 2007, Grosso moved abroad and signed a four-year contract with Lyon of the French Ligue 1 after passing a medical and agreeing personal terms. The transfer fee was €7.5 million He was issued the number 11 shirt. His first season with proved a successful one as he was a key part of the club's starting line-up in both the UEFA Champions League and Ligue 1, and saw him win the league title,
the Coupe de France, and the Trophée des Champions. In his second season with Lyon, Grosso was limited to just 22 league appearances, partially due to injury, but was heavily linked with a move back to Italy during the 2009 summer transfer window. In August 2009, he officially returned to Italy, joining Juventus.

Juventus
On 31 August 2009, it was confirmed Grosso had returned to Serie A to join Juventus following his two-year spell in France. After chasing the defender all summer long, the parties struck a deal on the final day of the transfer market at a €2 million fee plus bonus up to €1 million. He was instantly inserted into Juventus' starting XI and began the season in good form. He scored his first goal in a league game against Udinese in November 2009. He made 28 appearances during the season and scored two goals.

In the 2010–11 season, Juventus released several elder players, but Grosso reportedly refused any transfer. Juve youth product Paolo De Ceglie took back the starting place and Grosso was frozen from the start of season and excluded from 25-men squad for 2010–11 UEFA Europa League. However, after Juventus lost numbers of players due to injury, Grosso and Hasan Salihamidžić were recalled for the first time, on 6 November. He made two appearances in his final season, the 2011–12 season, as new head coach Antonio Conte either preferred De Ceglie or had a winger or wide midfielder deputize as a fullback or wingback in a 3–5–2 formation. Juventus won the title undefeated that season. Grosso's contract ended in the summer of 2012 and he opted to retire from professional football.

International career

Early career
Grosso made his international debut with the Italy national team on 30 April 2003 in a 2–1 friendly away win over Switzerland, under head coach Giovanni Trapattoni. He scored his first goal for Italy in a 1–1 away draw against Scotland, on 2 September 2005, in a 2006 FIFA World Cup qualifying match.

2006 World Cup

From 2005 onwards, Grosso became a regular member of the starting line-up at left-back under Marcello Lippi, and was called up to represent Italy at the 2006 FIFA World Cup by Lippi, playing a key role throughout the tournament as the Italians went on to win the title.

In injury time of the round of 16 fixture against Australia, with the score tied at 0–0, Grosso advanced with the ball into the box from the left flank and was fouled in the penalty area by Lucas Neill, who went to ground, causing Grosso to stumble. Francesco Totti subsequently converted the decisive penalty issued by referee Luis Medina Cantalejo, as a ten-man Italy won the match 1–0 to advance to the quarter-finals. However, Grosso was accused of diving by some media outlets. In 2010, Grosso sat down with an Australian media outlet where he said he did not stay on his feet because he was exhausted and "didn’t have the strength to go forward", he said he "felt contact, so I went down" and "maybe I accentuated it a little bit", but insisted that after reviewing the replay that Neill did commit a foul.

On 4 July 2006, Grosso scored the first goal against hosts Germany in the 119th minute of the World Cup semi-finals with a curling left-footed strike beyond the reach of Jens Lehmann into the Germans' net from the edge of the box, which commentator John Motson would describe as "magnificent", while Grosso ran about screaming "Non ci credo!" ("I don't believe it!") as his teammates celebrated. In the World Cup final, five days later, he scored the winning penalty against France in a 5–3 victory in the resulting shoot-out after a 1–1 draw following extra-time, which allowed the Italy national team to win their fourth World Cup title.

Later career
Grosso was also included in Roberto Donadoni's 23-man Italy squad for UEFA Euro 2008. He made a substitute appearance in Italy's opening match of the tournament, a 3–0 defeat to the Netherlands, but was subsequently started in the remaining two group matches, a 1–1 draw against Romania, and a 2–0 win over France, and was praised in the Italian media for his performances along the left flank as Italy advanced from the group in second place. In the quarter-final match against eventual champions Spain, he helped the team keep a clean sheet and converted Italy's first penalty in the resulting shoot-out, which Spain won 4–2.

Following the tournament, Grosso was also first choice left-back in returning Italy manager Marcello Lippi's Azzurri squad for the 2009 FIFA Confederations Cup and the 2010 World Cup qualifying campaign. For the 2010 World Cup, he was called up to the pre-World Cup training camp alongside Juventus teammates Gianluigi Buffon, Giorgio Chiellini, Fabio Cannavaro, Nicola Legrottaglie, Mauro Camoranesi, Antonio Candreva, Claudio Marchisio and Vincenzo Iaquinta on 4–5 May, and was included in the 30-men preliminary squad announced on 11 May. However, in the second training camp, he was dropped, alongside Candreva.

Managerial career
At the start of the 2013–14 season, it was announced Grosso would take up a coaching position in the Juventus youth system. On 11 March 2014, he was appointed as the new manager of the Juventus Primavera (U-19) youth team following a string of poor performances under manager Andrea Zanchetta, who was transferred to another position within the youth system.

On 13 June 2017, Grosso was named head coach of Bari in Serie B. The following April, his home was vandalised by fans of local rivals Pescara, who hanged a rooster, the mascot of his club. The team finished 7th and were eliminated from the playoffs by Cittadella.

On 21 June 2018, Grosso was appointed manager of Hellas Verona, signing a two-year deal at the newly relegated Serie B club. He was sacked the following 1 May after a shock 3–2 home loss to relegation-threatened Livorno.

On 5 November 2019, Grosso was appointed manager of Serie A club Brescia. He was sacked on 2 December after three straight defeats without a single goal.

On 25 August 2020, Grosso was appointed the manager of Swiss Super League side Sion. He was sacked on 5 March 2021, after a 3–0 home loss to Lugano as Sion sat in last place in the league.

On 23 March 2021, Grosso was appointed the manager of Frosinone.

Style of play
A former attacking midfielder, Grosso was a physical, quick, and energetic player, who was sound both defensively and offensively, due to his work-rate, attacking prowess, technique, and stamina, which enabled him to excel as an offensive–minded left-back. A versatile footballer, regarded as one of the top Italian full-backs of his generation, he was also adept with accurate crossing ability, which even allowed him to be deployed as a winger or as an attacking wing-back on either flank throughout his career, despite being naturally left-footed. Unusually for a defender, he was also a free kick, penalty and corner kick specialist, responsibilities usually held by a striker or midfielder.

Personal life
Grosso is married to Jessica Repetto.

Career statistics
Source:

Club

International

International goals
Scores and results list Italy's goal tally first.

Managerial statistics

Honours

Club
Perugia
UEFA Intertoto Cup: 2003

Inter Milan
Serie A: 2006–07
Supercoppa Italiana: 2006

Lyon
Ligue 1: 2007–08
Coupe de France: 2007–08
Trophée des Champions: 2007

Juventus
Serie A: 2011–12

International
Italy
FIFA World Cup: 2006

Orders
  CONI: Golden Collar of Sports Merit: 2006

  4th Class / Officer: Ufficiale Ordine al Merito della Repubblica Italiana: 2006

References

External links

 
 FootballDatabase.com provides Grosso's profile and stats
 

1977 births
Living people
Sportspeople from Chieti
Italian footballers
Italy international footballers
Serie A players
Serie B players
Serie C players
Serie D players
Ligue 1 players
Olympique Lyonnais players
A.C. Perugia Calcio players
Palermo F.C. players
2006 FIFA World Cup players
UEFA Euro 2008 players
2009 FIFA Confederations Cup players
FIFA World Cup-winning players
Inter Milan players
Juventus F.C. players
S.S. Chieti Calcio players
Italian expatriate footballers
Expatriate footballers in France
Italian expatriate sportspeople in France
Association football defenders
Hellas Verona F.C. managers
S.S.C. Bari managers
Serie B managers
Serie A managers
Brescia Calcio managers
FC Sion managers
Frosinone Calcio managers
Officers of the Order of Merit of the Italian Republic
Italian football managers
Italian expatriate football managers
Footballers from Abruzzo